"Something or Nothing" is a song by British  rock band Uriah Heep. The song was written by Ken Hensley, Mick Box and Gary Thain and sung by David Byron. The song is the sixth track on their seventh album Wonderworld, it is also the first track on the second side of the album. "Something or Nothing" was recorded in Munich, Germany, in a studio called "Musicland" during January and March 1974. The B-side of the song is "What Can I Do" which has never been released on the album "Wonderworld". The song is being played with only four chords: D,A,C and G. The song has been performed during Uriah Heep live concerts, and was included on their second live album Live at Shepperton '74 as the fourth track.

Personnel
 Mick Box – lead guitars
 David Byron – vocals
 Ken Hensley – organ, guitar
 Lee Kerslake – drums
 Gary Thain – bass

References

1974 singles
Uriah Heep (band) songs
Songs written by Ken Hensley
Songs written by Mick Box
Songs written by Gary Thain
1974 songs
Bronze Records singles